Brighton and Hove City Council is the local authority of the city of Brighton and Hove. It is a unitary authority, having the powers of a non-metropolitan county and district council combined. It provides a full range of local government services including Council Tax billing, libraries, social services, processing planning applications, highways, waste collection and disposal, and it is a local education authority.

Powers and functions
The local authority derives its powers and functions from the Local Government Act 1972 and subsequent legislation. For the purposes of local government, Brighton and Hove is within a non-metropolitan area of England. As a unitary authority, Brighton and Hove City Council has the powers and functions of both a non-metropolitan county and district council combined. In its capacity as a district council it is a billing authority collecting Council Tax and business rates, it processes local planning applications, it is responsible for housing, waste collection and environmental health. In its capacity as a county council it is a local education authority, responsible for social services, libraries and waste disposal.

Museums service
The council's museums service takes the name Royal Pavilion & Museums, and operates the Royal Pavilion, Brighton Museum and Art Gallery, Hove Museum and Art Gallery, the Booth Museum of Natural History and Preston Manor.

Political control

The current makeup of the council is:

Since the first election to the council in 1996 political control of the council has been held by the following parties:

The Green led council from 2011 to 2015 was the first of its kind in the United Kingdom. The Greens regained control of the Council in 2020, after the incumbent Labour administration collapsed and made way for a Green minority government.

Councillors and wards

 
When Brighton Borough Council and Hove Borough Council merged in 1996 the wards were carried over from the respective councils who had both been under East Sussex County Council. 
There were originally 26 wards each with three councillors each, totalling 78 councillors in the newly created Brighton and Hove Borough Council: Brunswick and Adelaide, Goldsmid, Hangleton, Hanover, Hollingbury, Kings Cliff, Marine, Moulsecoomb, Nevill, North Portslade, Patcham, Portslade South, Preston, Queens Park, Regency, Rottingdean, Seven Dials, St. Peters, Stanford, Stanmer, Tenantry, Vallance, Westbourne, Westdene, Wish, Woodingdean

The 2001 boundary review reduced the wards to 21 wards with a mix of two or three councillors each totalling 54 councillors for the then city council. These boundary were used in the 2003 election for the first time with the following wards: Brunswick and Adelaide, Central Hove, East Brighton, Goldsmid, Hangleton and Knoll, Hanover and Elm Grove, Hollingbury and Stanmer (which then became Hollingdean and Stanmer in 2007), Stanford (which became Hove Park in 2007), Moulsecoomb and Bevendean, North Portslade, Patcham, Preston Park, Queen's Park, Regency, Rottingdean Coastal, South Portslade, St Peter's and North Laine, Westbourne, Wish, Withdean, Woodingdean.

Latest results for Brighton and Hove City Councillors by ward:

Duke and Duchess of Sussex debate

In December 2018 Brighton and Hove City Council held a debate in response to a petition on behalf of residents which called on the council to reject the usage of the Duke and Duchess of Sussex title, which is "disrespectful to the county of East Sussex".

References

 
Unitary authority councils of England
Local education authorities in England
Local authorities in East Sussex
Billing authorities in England
Brighton and Hove